Yamaçlı is a village in the Şirvan District of Siirt Province in Turkey. The village had a population of 315 in 2021.

The hamlets of Ardıtaş and Bardacık are attached to Yamaçlı.

References 

Kurdish settlements in Siirt Province
Villages in Şirvan District